2003 FESPIC Youth Games, the 1st and only FESPIC Youth Games in history(Chinese：2003年第一屆遠東和南太平洋地區青年殘疾人運動會、2003年第一届远东和南太平洋地区青年残疾人运动会、第一屆遠南青殘會、第一届远南青残会), were an Asia Pacific regional youth disabled multi-sport event held in Hong Kong, China from 23 to 27 September 2003. Around 314 athletes from 15 participating nations participated at the games which featured 5 sports. Hong Kong is the only nation that had hosted the FESPIC Youth Games, and it was the first and only time Hong Kong hosted the event. The games were opened by Tung Chee Hwa at the Ma On Shan Sports Ground. In 2006, both the FESPIC organisation and the event were officially defunct and succeeded by the Asian Paralympic Committee and the Asian Youth Para Games respectively.

Organisation

Development and preparation

The 2003 FESPIC Youth Games Organising Committee was formed to oversee the staging of the games.

Venues

The games

Participating nations

Sports

  Athletics
  Badminton
  Boccia
  Swimming
  Table tennis

Medal table

References

External links
 2003 FESPIC Youth Games official website 

2003
FESPIC
2003 in Asian sport
Youth sport in China
FESPIC Youth
Multi-sport events in China
International sports competitions hosted by China